(born June 8, 1978) is a Japanese former mixed martial artist and professional wrestler. A professional MMA competitor from 2000 until 2007, Yokoi fought for PRIDE, Shooto, RINGS, and DEEP, while in professional wrestling he wrestled mainly for Pro Wrestling Zero1.

Mixed martial arts career
Yokoi originally started training in Judo in high school, but he was more interested in Universal Wrestling Federation and its offshoots. He participated at a Shooto mixed martial arts tournament during his stay at the Kinki University, and later moved to Fighting Network RINGS. Yokoi gained the nickname "Kaibutsu-kun" (meaning "Monster-kun") for his physical resemblance to the title character from the 1980s anime series Kaibutsu-kun.

Fighting Network RINGS
Yokoi made his professional debut in 2000 and won his first eight fights, mostly fighting in the RINGS organization before moving to compete in PRIDE. After RINGS's demise, he followed fellow judoka Tsuyoshi Kohsaka and joined his Alliance team.

PRIDE Fighting Championships
Yokoi made his debut for the organization on November 24, 2002 at Pride 23 against Dutch kickboxer Jerrel Venetiaan, winning in the third round via armbar submission.

After picking up a TKO win over Wilson Gouveia, the undefeated Yokoi fought former Pride Heavyweight Champion Antônio Rodrigo Nogueira in the opening round of the Pride Total Elimination 2004 tournament. Yokoi performed unexpectedly well, taking Nogueira down repeatedly with judo throws and pulling out reversals and occasional ground and pound on the Brazilian jiu-jitsu expert, but he ultimately fell to an anaconda choke in the second round for the first loss of his career.

At PRIDE 28, Yokoi faced Heath Herring, but he was soon overwhelmed with a right hook and multiple knees, including illegal strikes to the back to the head that granted Herring a warning. He eventually lost the fight by TKO in the same way. Yokoi looked to make up for his defeat at the next event by taking on Mario Sperry, Brazilian jiu-jitsu world champion and Nogueira's trainer, but after an uneventful round of clinch striking Yokoi was again downed and hit with knees and soccer kicks for the TKO.

Yokoi's final fight in PRIDE was at PRIDE 30, where he faced Quinton "Rampage" Jackson. Yokoi showed himself active again, gaining dominant position with an early omoplata sweep, but Jackson used his superior strength to reverse him and threw heavy punches and kicks until the referee stopped the match.

Post-PRIDE
Yokoi bounced back with a win via rear-naked choke submission win a year after last fight and then fought again a year later in Finland, losing via TKO. With a career record of 11-5, having won only one of his last six fights, Yokoi retired.

Professional wrestling career

Pro Wrestling Zero1 (2002–2007)
Yokoi joined Pro Wrestling Zero1 in May 2002. He started teaming up with other shoot-style wrestlers, namely Wataru Sakata, Yuki Ishikawa and Yoshiaki Fujiwara, and also enjoyed significant wins in the Fire Festival, beating Kohei Sato and Tetsuhiro Kuroda. He spent the rest of the year in random tag team matches, as well as losing efforts to Shinjiro Otani and Kazuhiko Ogasawara. Eventually, he formed a tag team with Kohei Sato in midst of the feud between the native wrestlers and Steve Corino's American faction, and they challenged Corino and CW Anderson for the NWA Intercontinental Tag Team Championship in two separate occasions, though coming short in both. 

Around the same time, in which their team was named as Rowdy, they started appearing in All Japan Pro Wrestling as Zero-One representatives. Sato and Yokoi put their eyes in the All Asia Tag Team Championship, taking part in a special league for the vacated title. Rowdy was successful, winning the belts against Turmeric Storm (Kazushi Miyamoto and Tomoaki Honma) in July 2003. They retained the title against challengers like King Adamo and King Joe and Nobukazu Hirai and Shigeo Okumura, but ended up losing it in October to the Zero-One team of Kintaro Kanemura and Tetsuhiro Kuroda.

After the All Japan affair, Yokoi diversified to his singles career aside from Rowdy, and challenged The Predator for the Zero-One United States Heavyweight Championship and Masato Tanaka for the NWA United National Heavyweight Championship. He and Sato also challenged for the NWA tag team titles several times, but they failed. From 2004 to 2006, Yokoi competed sporadically in Hustle as a member of the babyface Hustle Army, teaming up with "Hustle K" Toshiaki Kawada, while trying luck in Zero-One's Fire Festival tournaments and keeping his team with Kohei Sato. He was released from Zero-One in February 2007, leaving pro wrestling altogether.

Championship and accomplishments
All Japan Pro Wrestling
All Asia Tag Team Championship (1 time) - with Kohei Sato
All Asia Tag Team Title League (2003) - with Kohei Sato

Mixed martial arts record

|-
| Loss
| align=center| 11–5
| Mikko Rupponen
| TKO (strikes)
| Fight Festival 21
| 
| align=center| 1
| align=center| 2:51
| Finland
| 
|-
| Win
| align=center| 11–4
| Andre Fyeet
| Submission (rear-naked choke)
| World Pro Fighting Championships 1
| 
| align=center| 1
| align=center| 3:11
| Nevada, United States
| 
|-
| Loss
| align=center| 10–4
| Quinton Jackson
| TKO (punches and stomps)
| PRIDE 30
| 
| align=center| 1
| align=center| 4:05
| Saitama, Japan
| 
|-
| Loss
| align=center| 10–3
| Mario Sperry
| TKO (knees)
| PRIDE 29
| 
| align=center| 1
| align=center| 9:08
| Saitama, Japan
|Return to Light Heavyweight.
|-
| Loss
| align=center| 10–2
| Heath Herring
| TKO (knees)
| PRIDE 28
| 
| align=center| 1
| align=center| 1:55
| Saitama, Japan
| 
|-
| Loss
| align=center| 10–1
| Antônio Rodrigo Nogueira
| Submission (anaconda choke)
| PRIDE Total Elimination 2004
| 
| align=center| 2
| align=center| 1:25
| Saitama, Japan
| 
|-
| Win
| align=center| 10–0
| Wilson Gouveia
| TKO (punches)
| HOOKnSHOOT: Absolute Fighting Championships 2
| 
| align=center| 3
| align=center| 2:26
| Florida, United States
| 
|-
| Win
| align=center| 9–0
| Jerrel Venetiaan
| Submission (armbar)
| PRIDE 23
| 
| align=center| 2
| align=center| 3:29
| Tokyo, Japan
| 
|-
| Win
| align=center| 8–0
| Bulldozer George
| Submission (rear-naked choke)
| UFO: Legend
| 
| align=center| 1
| align=center| 0:47
| Tokyo, Japan
| 
|-
| Win
| align=center| 7–0
| Memo Diaz
| Decision (unanimous)
| DEEP: 4th Impact
| 
| align=center| 3
| align=center| 5:00
| Nagoya, Japan
| 
|-
| Win
| align=center| 6–0
| Katsuhisa Fujii
| Decision (unanimous)
| RINGS: World Title Series Grand Final
| 
| align=center| 3
| align=center| 5:00
| Yokohama, Japan
| 
|-
| Win
| align=center| 5–0
| Kestutis Smirnovas
| Decision
| RINGS Lithuania: Bushido RINGS 3
| 
| align=center| 2
| align=center| 5:00
| Lithuania
| 
|-
| Win
| align=center| 4–0
| Ken Orihashi
| TKO (lost points)
| RINGS: World Title Series 4
| 
| align=center| 1
| align=center| 3:14
| Tokyo, Japan
| 
|-
| Win
| align=center| 3–0
| Masaya Kojima
| Submission (armlock)
| RINGS: Battle Genesis Vol. 8
| 
| align=center| 1
| align=center| 2:12
| Tokyo, Japan
| 
|-
| Win
| align=center| 2–0
| Ricardo Fyeet
| Submission (armbar)
| RINGS: 10th Anniversary
| 
| align=center| 1
| align=center| 2:34
| Tokyo, Japan
| 
|-
| Win
| align=center| 1–0
| Masaya Inoue
| Decision (majority)
| Shooto: R.E.A.D. 8
| 
| align=center| 2
| align=center| 5:00
| Osaka, Japan
|Light Heavyweight bout.

Submission grappling record
KO PUNCHES
|- style="text-align:center; background:#f0f0f0;"
| style="border-style:none none solid solid; "|Result
| style="border-style:none none solid solid; "|Opponent
| style="border-style:none none solid solid; "|Method
| style="border-style:none none solid solid; "|Event
| style="border-style:none none solid solid; "|Date
| style="border-style:none none solid solid; "|Round
| style="border-style:none none solid solid; "|Time
| style="border-style:none none solid solid; "|Notes
|-
|Draw|| Koshi Matsumoto || Draw || Quintet Fight Night 2 || February 3, 2019 || 1|| 10:00||
|-

References

External links

PRIDE profile
Official blog
 ZERO1 USA English language website
 ZERO1 Japanese language website

Living people
1978 births
Japanese male mixed martial artists
Heavyweight mixed martial artists
Mixed martial artists utilizing judo
Mixed martial artists utilizing wrestling
Japanese male judoka
Japanese male professional wrestlers
Sportspeople from Hokkaido
People from Iwamizawa, Hokkaido
All Asia Tag Team Champions